Rachecourt (Gaumais: Ratchcou; ; ;) is a village of Wallonia and a district of the municipality of Aubange, located in the province of Luxembourg, Belgium.

The village church dates from 1905 and is built in a Romanesque Revival style. The village contains an apple orchard for preserving traditional apple varieties, and an apple festival is held annually in Rachecourt in October.

References

External links

Former municipalities of Luxembourg (Belgium)